F-16 Aggressor is a video game developed by General Simulations Incorporated and published by Bethesda Softworks in 1998-1999.

Development
The game was announced in May 1998 by Virgin Interactive. In January 1999, Bethesda Softworks acquired the US publishing rights to the game.

Reception

The game received average reviews according to the review aggregation website GameRankings. Adam Pavlacka of NextGen said, "F-16 Aggressor deserves high praise as a pure simulator. It accurately depicts the F-16, and it runs on an average system. If you want to train as a pilot, it's terrific. If you're looking for an enjoyable combat experience, however, look elsewhere."

References

External links
 

1998 video games
Bethesda Softworks games
Combat flight simulators
Video games developed in the United Kingdom
Windows games
Windows-only games